The East End Theatre District is a precinct within the Melbourne central business district, and is bounded by Spring, Flinders, Swanston and Lonsdale Streets. The district is home to seven major theatres, including the Princess Theatre, Her Majesty's Theatre and the Regent Theatre. These theatres mostly house commercial productions of musicals, plays and other events, in contrast with the Southbank Arts Precinct over the Yarra River which focuses on publicly funded companies.

History
The East End of Melbourne was effectively formed by the Hoddle Grid, with Elizabeth Street the dividing line between east and west. The Hoddle Grid was laid out in 1837, following the founding of the Melbourne settlement in 1835.

Melbourne's first theatre, the Pavilion, was constructed adjacent to the Eagle Tavern on Bourke Street in 1842. The second theatre, the Queen's, was also constructed as part of a pub, however it was, and remains, the only major theatre in Melbourne's CBD built west of Elizabeth Street.

East End theatres
Seven surviving theatres exist within the East End. Other major entertainment venues in the East End Theatre District include live music venues 170 Russell and Max Watt's House of Music, Hoyts Melbourne Central, Palace Kino, Chinatown and ACMI cinemas.

Former theatres
The East End has been home to over 25 different theatres since 1841. Some of the major former theatres are listed below.

Economic impact
In July 2016, the East End Theatre District was reported to have made an economic contribution of $692 million, and an economic impact of $226 million, to the state of Victoria.

See also
List of theatres in Melbourne

References

Theatre in Melbourne
Melbourne City Centre